55th Regiment may refer to:

 55th (Kent) Heavy Anti-Aircraft Regiment, Royal Artillery
 55th (Westmorland) Regiment of Foot
 55th Air Defense Artillery Regiment

See also 
 55th Division (disambiguation)